Lau Shui Heung is a village in Fanling, North District, Hong Kong.

Administration
Lau Shui Heung is a recognized village under the New Territories Small House Policy.

See also
 Lau Shui Heung Reservoir
 Kwan Tei
 Kwan Tei River

References

Further reading
 Agreement No. CE 45/2008 (CE) Liantang / Heung Yuen Wai Boundary Control Point and Associated Works -Environmental Impact Assessment Report. Appendix 12.2f: Detailed Records of Identified Built Heritage Features within CHIA Study Area of the Lau Shui Heung Tunnel Section (South Tunnel)

External links

 Delineation of area of existing village Lau Shui Heung (Fanling) for election of resident representative (2019 to 2022)

Villages in North District, Hong Kong
Fanling